K.C. Confectionery Limited is one of the largest confectioners in the Caribbean region. Founded in 1922 by Ibrahim Khan as a cottage industry and developed as a factory in 1957, but it was fully automated in the early 1990s. Today 65% of the goods are exported. The main Foreign Markets of this company are targeted in the United States, Canada, the United Kingdom, Antigua and Barbuda, Bahamas, Barbados, Belize, Dominican Republic, Dominica, Grenada and Carriacou, Guyana, St Kitts and Nevis, Anguilla, St Lucia, St Vincent and the Grenadines, Jamaica, Suriname, British Virgin Islands, Curacao, Aruba and Guadeloupe.

Locations 
K.C. Confectionery headquarters are in Trinidad and Tobago, at Couva.

Products manufactured and distributed by K.C. Candy

Gum
 Cosmic II
 Cosmic Gumballs (Gumballes de Cosmic)
 Cricket Gumballs
 Football Gum
 Ice Blass
 Jalapeño
 Sour Face
 Speckled Egg
 Pumpkin
 Watermelon

Hard Candy
 Choco Fill Mints
 Chocolate Centre
 Clear Mints
 Dinner Mint
 Fruit Fantasy
 Ginger Mint
 Ice Mint
 Mango Chilli
 Menthol Drop
 Menthol Drop Light
 Super Mint
After Dinner Mints

Lolli Pops
 Frenzi pop
 Gumbo Pops
 Red Tongue Pops
 Tamarind Pops
 Peanut Pops
 Guava Pops

Mixtures
 Fun Mix
 Kiddy Candy
 Trini Mints

Toffees & Chews
 Creamy Toffees
 Fruit Chews
 Orange Quality Toffees
 Strawberry Quality Toffees
 Strongman Toffee

Bar
 Butter Nut

References

External links 
Company Website

Food and drink companies of Trinidad and Tobago
Confectionery companies
Brands of Trinidad and Tobago